The End of the Day is a 1939 French drama film directed by Julien Duvivier and starring Victor Francen, Michel Simon and Louis Jouvet. It was shot at the Epinay Studios in Paris and on location around the city as well as at the Château de Lourmarin in Provence. The film's sets were designed by the art director Jacques Krauss.

Plot
Monsieur St. Clair (Louis Jouvet), an aging romantic leading man, has decided to retire from the stage, but he is broke and goes to an old-age home for elderly actors. There he meets the other retired actors, all of whom know each other from having worked the same places over the years. One actor, Marny (Victor Francen), is a melancholy soul primarily because years ago his wife left him to have a fling with St. Clair and died of a self-inflicted gunshot wound. As an actor Marny was brilliant, but he never got the recognition he deserved, nor anything like the popularity of St. Clair. Cabrissade (Michel Simon), the third main protagonist of the film, is a prankster and free spirit who played mostly understudy roles during his career, and never even got the chance to star.

Being actors they are each full of themselves in their own way.  However, they are all equally dependent on this charitable retirement home for their support.  Cabrissade, however, delights in defying the management's rules and playing practical jokes on both staff and residents alike.  Unknown to him or any resident, the retirement home is nearly bankrupt, and the management plans to close it.

A 17 year old local barmaid becomes infatuated with St. Clair, who woos her the way he has wooed many others before.  However, she sees St. Clair only as a famous romantic and not the pompous self-absorbed has-been that he really is. Marny, her platonic friend, burns as he watches the girl fall under St. Clair's spell.  However, when St. Clair comes into some money he leaves her behind and goes to Monte Carlo to blow it all.

As the retirement home slides downhill, privileges like electricity after 9pm and evening wine are suspended, which prompts Cabrissade to lead a revolt of the residents against the management.  But as they express their demands for better treatment, the director informs them that the home will be closing and each will be split up and transferred to other homes. This is frightening to this group of actors who really have nothing in common with ordinary folk.

One couple who have been together for 35 years decide to marry as it will ensure they can stay together.  The wedding takes place and at the party afterword the director announces that he has succeeded in obtaining financing to keep the home open.  It is decided to put on a play for the new benefactors.

St. Clair returns home broke and immediately begins to entice the young barmaid again.  His ego is stroked as she professes that she would die for him.  He presses her to prove her love, and a plan is made.

The play goes on, and it is demanded that Marny play the lead role—a role which Cabrissade longs to perform. Cabrissade appeals to Marny to allow him to play the role, but Marny scoffs at the idea.  As the pleading becomes more intense there is a tussle and Marny falls unconscious.  Cabrissade dresses himself in Marny's costume and takes the stage.  However, immediately upon seeing the audience he is struck by stage fright and cannot say his lines.  The production stops and Cabrissade is deeply humiliated.  Later, Marny performs the part.

Cabrissade realizes he has been fooling himself all his life, and in despair dies.

St. Clair goes to the bar to find the barmaid and get her to commit suicide to prove to himself that he has such power over women—even at his age.  However, Marny is there already, discussing how the play went once it resumed.  As he speaks with St. Clair he begins to realize what she is about to do and rushes upstairs to stop her.  There is a shot, but no one has been hit.  Marny is now unspeakably angry with St. Clair for nearly causing another person to die like his ex-wife.  However, when he comes back downstairs St. Clair has descended into madness, performing scenes from Don Juan as if he were living them right there.

St. Clair is sent to an asylum.  Marny reads a eulogy for Cabrissade written by Cabrissade himself.  Marny bites his lip as he gushes over the great talents of Cabrissade until he cannot go any further.  At that point, he speaks from the heart about Cabrissade's love and loyalty to the theater and his nobility at following this path.

Accolades
The film won Best Foreign Film at the 1939 National Board of Review Awards, and came second at the 1939 New York Film Critics Circle Awards.

Cast
Victor Francen as Marny
Michel Simon as Cabrissade
Louis Jouvet as Raphaël Saint Clair
Madeleine Ozeray as Jeanette
Alexandre Arquillière as Monsieur Lucien
Jean Joffre as Philémon
 Sylvie as  Madame Tusini
Arthur Devère as the director
Charles Granval as Deaubonne
Pierre Magnier as Laroche
Mme Lherbay as Madame Philémon
Jean Coquelin as Delormel
Auguste Bovério as the priest
Jean Aymé as Victor
Tony Jacquot as Pierrot
Gaby André as Danielle
Gaston Jacquet as Lacour
Maurice Schutz as Verneul

References

External links

The End of the Day at Films101

Films directed by Julien Duvivier
1939 drama films
1939 films
French drama films
French black-and-white films
1930s French-language films
1930s French films
Films shot at Epinay Studios